Waddington is a small village, 2 miles (3 km) north-west of Clitheroe in the Ribble Valley, Lancashire, England. The population of the civil parish at the 2011 census was 1,028. Before the 1974 county boundary changes, Waddington fell just within the Bowland Rural District of the West Riding of Yorkshire. It covers approximately 2000 acres of the Forest of Bowland.

It is home to both an Anglican church and a Methodist church, a social club with bowling green, a cafe, a post office, a playing field on which both cricket and football are played. Also, within the village there are three pubs, the Lower Buck Inn, the Higher Buck and the Waddington Arms. The village is a regular winner of the Lancashire Best Kept Village awards.

History

Waddington was a mesne manor of the ancient Lordship of Bowland which comprised a Royal Forest and a Liberty of ten manors. These spanned eight townships and four parishes, covering an area of almost  on the historic borders of Lancashire and Yorkshire. The manors within the Liberty were Slaidburn (Newton-in-Bowland, West Bradford, Grindleton), Knowlmere, Waddington, Easington, Bashall Eaves, Mitton, Withgill (Crook), Leagram, Hammerton and Dunnow (Battersby).

The Tempests were lords of the manor of Waddington from at least the early thirteenth century. The family is credited with endowing the parish church at Waddington. One of their number, Sir Nicholas Tempest, a Bowbearer of the Forest of Bowland, was hanged, drawn and quartered at Tyburn in 1537 for his part in the Pilgrimage of Grace.

Following his defeat in the Battle of Hexham during the Wars of the Roses on 15 May 1464, King Henry VI was sheltered by Lancastrian supporters at houses across the north of England. Following stays at Muncaster Castle on the Cumbrian coast and at nearby Bolton Hall, he went into hiding at Waddington Hall, the home of Sir Richard Tempest. He was betrayed by "a black monk of Addington" and on 13 July 1465, a group of Yorkist men, including Sir Richard's brother John, entered the home to arrest him. Henry fled into nearby woods but was soon captured.

Governance
Along with West Bradford, Grindleton and Sawley, the parish forms the Waddington and West Bradford ward of Ribble Valley Borough Council.
 The ward had a population of 2,636 in 2001, rising to 2,933 in 2011. The ward elects two councillors, who currently are Paul Elms and Bridget Hilton, both of the Conservative Party.

Media gallery

See also

Listed buildings in Waddington, Lancashire

References

External links

 Parish Council website
 Waddington Conservation Area Appraisal

Geography of Ribble Valley
Villages in Lancashire
Civil parishes in Lancashire
History of Yorkshire